Carl Fagerberg may refer to:
 Carl Fagerberg (footballer)
 Carl Fagerberg (sculptor)